Heribert Koch (born 8 February 1969) is a retired Swiss football defender.

References

1969 births
Living people
Swiss men's footballers
FC Aarau players
FC St. Gallen players
SW Bregenz players
FC Vaduz players
Swiss expatriate sportspeople in Liechtenstein
Expatriate footballers in Liechtenstein
Association football defenders
Swiss Super League players
Swiss expatriate footballers
Expatriate footballers in Austria
Swiss expatriate sportspeople in Austria